Soligo may refer to:
Soligo (river)
Soligo, Farra di Soligo, a frazione of Farra di Soligo
Evans Soligo